Amos Yudan (born November 5, 1936) is an Israeli businessman, Chairman of the Israel-China and Hong Kong chamber of commerce and CEO of Comodan, a company that promotes Sino-Israeli business. Yudan was the first Israeli to initiate trade exchange with China in 1981.

Business career

Yudan was born in Haifa (Israel) to Walter and Chaya Yudenberg.

During the 80's, Yudan managed the International Trade Division of Koor Trade Corporation, and in 1984 initiated the first trade relationships with companies in China. In 1987 he was asked by Israel's prime minister Mr. Shimon Peres to set up the first official Government owned company (Copeco Ltd) to establish and foster commercial activities between companies in China and Israel. The company was active till 1992, when official diplomatic relationships were announced between Israel and China. During these years, Yudan led the first business delegations from Israel to China and managed the first joint projects in the field of Agriculture and Telecommunication.

Since 1992, Yudan is the CEO and President of Comodan Far East Ltd, which specialises in business development and trade between Israel and China. Yudan initiated and led numerous joint ventures, and implemented large scale projects of Israeli companies in China, and Chinese companies in Israel. Yudan played an important role in the development of the Red Line section of Tel Aviv Light Rail. 

In December 2011, Yudan has been awarded the prestige "Life Achievement Prize" of the Federation of Israeli Chambers of Commerce (FICC) as recognition for his many years of contribution to the promotion of trade between Israel and China. The prize was granted by Israel's Minister for Trade and Industry Mr. Shalom Simchon and the Chinese Ambassador to Israel.

References

 The Palestinian Strategic Report 2005, Al Zaytouna Centre for Studies & Consultations, Beirut, Lebanon
 Fox News, May 2, 2013, Israeli leader heads to China for talks with political, business leaders
 Sino-Israeli Relations: Current Reality and Future Prospects, Aaron Shai, Department of East Asian Studies, Tel Aviv University
 China Daily, October 2, 2012
 CNTV, October 2, 2012
 Jerusalem Post, February 21, 2013, International Relations The Panda in the Room

1936 births
Living people
Israeli chief executives
China–Israel relations
20th-century Israeli businesspeople
21st-century Israeli businesspeople